Pongratz or Pongrátz is a German language surname. It stems from the male given name Pancras. Notable people with the name include:

Anton Pongratz (1948–2008), Romanian fencer
Erzsébet Vasvári-Pongrátz (born 1954), Hungarian sports shooter
Gergely Pongrátz (1932–2005), Hungarian anti-communist
Lothar Pongratz (1952–2013), German bobsledder
Oliver Pongratz (born 1973), German former badminton player
Ștefan Pongratz (born 1930), Romanian rower

References 

Surnames of Austrian origin
German-language surnames
Surnames from given names
Hungarian-language surnames